Roberto Néstor Agueropolis (born 30 March 1954 in Rosario) is an Argentine former football player who played as a defender.

He played for Newell's Old Boys (1975-1976), San Martín de Tucumán (1977-1977), Newell's Old Boys (1978-1980), Panathinaikos (1980-1982), Rodos F.C. (1982-1983).

External links

leprosoclubxclub.com

1954 births
Living people
Argentine people of Greek descent
Argentina international footballers
Newell's Old Boys footballers
Panathinaikos F.C. players
Expatriate footballers in Greece
Argentine Primera División players
Argentine expatriate footballers
Argentine footballers
Argentine expatriate sportspeople in Greece
Association football defenders
Footballers from Rosario, Santa Fe
Rodos F.C. players